Eriopithex ishigakiensis is a moth in the family Geometridae. It is found on the Ryukyu Islands.

References

Moths described in 1971
Eupitheciini
Moths of Japan